is a stop on the Setagaya Line by Tokyu Corporation and is located in Segataya, Tokyo, Japan.

Station layout
There are two side platforms on two tracks.

Surroundings
Gōtokuji Station on the Odakyu Odawara Line is within walking distance.

History
The station opened on May 1, 1925. As of October 16, 1939, it was known as the  before reverting to the Yamashita Station in May of 1969.

References 

Railway stations in Japan opened in 1925
Tokyu Setagaya Line
Stations of Tokyu Corporation
Railway stations in Tokyo